The diocesan governor of Trondhjem  in Norway was a government agency of the Kingdom of Norway.

The  (diocesan county) of Trondhjem was established in 1662 by the king. The new Trondhjems stiftamt encompassed the whole Diocese of Trondhjem and it was originally made up the subordinate counties: Trondhjems amt, Vardøhus amt, and the Romsdal and Nordmøre bailiff's territories within Romsdalens amt. In 1685, Nordlandenes amt was transferred into Trondhjems stiftamt from the Bergenhus stiftamt. In 1804, Trondhjems amt (county) was divided into two new counties: Nordre Trondhjems amt and Søndre Trondhjems amt. In 1844, the northern portion (Nordlandenes amt, Tromsø amt, and Finmarkens amt) of the stiftamt was separated and formed the new Tromsø stiftamt. In 1919, there was a large county reorganization in Norway and every stiftamt was abolished and the counties were renamed .

List of diocesan governors 
The following is a list of the governors of the Trondhjems stiftamt.

References

Trondhjem stiftamt